John Mathews (died 1757) was an early American pioneer in Augusta County, Virginia, where he served as an officer in the county militia, a vestryman for Augusta Parish, and a justice of the peace. He was the progenitor of the Mathews political family from Virginia and the American South. His sons included George Mathews (1739–1812) and Sampson Mathews (c. 1737–1807). Other descendants include Henry M. Mathews (1834–1884) and Mason Mathews Patrick (1863–1942).

Origin
John Mathews' place of birth and parentage are subject to debate. He arrived in the Valley of Virginia around 1737, before the establishment of Augusta County, Virginia. Many sources identify him as a Scotch-Irish immigrant or of Irish ancestry, with others specifying that he or his descendants were of Welsh ancestry.

An 1869 London publication states that a branch of a prominent Welsh Mathew family "still exists in the north-west of Ireland," leading some to suggest that John Mathews of Augusta County, Virginia was a relative of this family through a Theobald Mathew (d. 1699), whose father George Mathew moved from Radyr, Wales to Thurles, County Tipperary, Ireland in 1625. Others have claimed that John Mathews descended from the same Welsh Mathew family, but through different branches. A great-grandson of John Mathews, James Hervey Otey, claims that Mathews descended from Samuel Mathews (1630–1660), a colonial governor of Virginia, while yet another source indicates that John Mathews was the son of British admiral Thomas Mathews. 
None of these connections have been corroborated.

The Scotch-Irish immigration to America began in 1717, with a majority of these immigrants from northern Ireland arriving first in Pennsylvania. It is believed that most of the early settlers of Augusta County, Virginia were first or second generation Scotch-Irish immigrants who came from Pennsylvania. 19th Century Augusta County historian Joseph A. Waddell explains that the time and place in which Mathews settled (present-day Rockbridge County, Virginia) was predominately settled by Scotch-Irish immigrants, stating that "up to the time of the Revolutionary War, very few persons of any other race [besides Scotch-Irish] came to live in the county."

Settlement

John Mathews settled in Augusta County, Virginia, in what is present-day Rockbridge County, around 1737. At this time, Augusta County was a sparsely populated frontier county with an indefinite western boundary. The Colonial Virginia government sought to develop "buffer settlements of European Protestants" to protect the interior of the colony from Indian conflict and prevent French expansion eastward, among other reasons. In pursuit of this aim, the State granted large amounts of land and delegated authority to a select few early settlers of the region, who quickly formed a frontier elite and fashioned a conservative, hierarchical society which closely mirrored those of eastern Virginia.  

Mathews settled first in a 92,100 acre tract granted by the Virginia Governor's Council to land speculator Benjamin Borden, who recruited immigrants from the Scotch-Irish immigration. When new land opened to for settlement in the upper valley to the south of Borden's tract, Mathews made a rush for these lands and in 1739 received a grant for 1,600 acres, which placed him among the top freeholders in the county by acreage. Only thirteen men owned more than 1000 acres in 1745, at a time when approximately two-thirds of eligible white men owned no land at all. Mathews' tract was located in the valley of Mill Creek, a tributary of Buffalo Creek in the Forks of the James neighborhood. Of an oblong diamond shape three miles long and a half mile wide in the middle, this tract extended near present-day Buffalo Forge to the north and Hickory Hill to the south; the Falling Springs Presbyterian Church is now located on this site. Here Mathews built a log "Manor House" for his family and remained for life. Over ensuing years, he bought and sold numerous landholdings and made improvements to his lands.  In 1748, he was identified in county records as a yeoman farmer, but by 1750 he was recognized as a gentleman, or a member of the landed gentry of colonial Virginia.

Military service
In 1742, Mathews served as a captain of Augusta County militia. At this time, the Six Nations Iroquois Confederacy, finding the white settlers of western Pennsylvania and Virginia to be in violation of the 1722 Treaty of Albany, launched numerous offensives against the frontier communities, resulting in significant losses to life and property of Augusta County settlers. Such activity would continue over the years, often during winter, when food and supplies were relatively scarce. Mathews cited "losses by Indians" in the winter of 1745. When the French and Indian War broke out in 1755, up to five of Mathews' sons served in the Braddock's Expedition to capture the French Fort Duquesne and halt French and Indian advances into the British settlement, while the senior Mathews provided provisions for the expedition. The result was a decisive defeat for the British; of the approximately 1,300 men Braddock led into battle, 456 were killed and 422 wounded, with Braddock among the dead. The loss left the Augusta County frontier exposed to Indian attack.  The following year, 1756, Mathews served as a captain of infantry for the Augusta County militia.

Religious role
In 1746, in what was the first election held in the county, Mathews and eleven other men were elected to the vestry of the Anglican Church for Augusta Parish. At this time in Virginia, vestrymen, though ecclesiastic officials, were de facto public officers who represented the entirety of the local government, While Mathews and his sons identified with the Anglican church, most of the elected vestrymen were Presbyterian. Waddell explains that these dissenting Presbyterians "probably pleaded the necessity" of taking the oaths of allegiance to the established Church of England. Despite being a numerical minority, the Anglican coalition shaped early religious life in the county and formed an alliance with its Presbyterian counterpart. The vestry was responsible for the processioning of lands, issuing levies, providing for parish expenses, tending to the poor, and other local administrative needs. Vestrymen also served as churchwardens for the parish, and in this role were responsible for the upkeep of public morals. Mathews provided his home as a place of service for the Anglican congregation. In his will he left ten dollars to the poor of Augusta Parish.

Judicial and civil responsibilities
Mathews was recommended justice of the peace of the Magistrate's Court for Augusta County in 1746, and had qualified by the fall of 1751. This was the most authoritative position in the county, and was typically held by the county's largest landholders. In this role, he issued warrants and reviewed arrests.

Mathews also acted as an overseer of early road construction efforts in the county, including, in 1753, a road in the North Forks of the James River, for which forty-five workers were employed, and another, presumably smaller road, begun in 1754, for which three men were employed.

Family

John Mathews married Ann Archer, a Scotch-Irish immigrant. They had eleven children: John, Joshua, Richard, Sampson, George, William, Archer, Jane, Anna, Rachel, and Elizabeth. Mathews' eldest son, John, was murdered along with his family in their home in 1763. A relative of Joshua Mathews later deeded this land to the trustees of the Falling Springs Presbyterian Church, which now stands on this site. Four of Mathews' sons served in public office in the State of Virginia: Sampson, George, and Archer Mathews were elected to the Virginia General Assembly, and William Mathews was a justice of the peace in his locality. George Mathews additionally served as a governor of Georgia and a US Representative to the First Congress.

Other notable descendants
Numerous descendants of John Mathews have had notable roles in public affairs. Some of them are listed below:

George Mathews Jr. (1774–1836); Presiding Judge of the Louisiana Supreme Court
John Mathews (1768–1849); Virginia House Delegate
James W. Mathews (d. 1825); Virginia House Delegate
Mason Mathews (1803–1878); Virginia House Delegate
Henry M. Mathews (1834–1884); 5th Governor of West Virginia
Alexander F. Mathews (1838–1906); West Virginia University Regent
William G. Mathews (1877–1923); Federal Judge
Mason Mathews Patrick (1863–1942); Chief of U.S. Army Air Service/Corps
George Mathews Edgar (1837-1913); President of University of Arkansas

References

Bibliography
 
 
 
 
 
 
 
 
 
 
 
 
 
 
 
 
 
 
 
 
 
 

1757 deaths
18th-century American people
American militia officers
American pioneers
American planters
Mathews family of Virginia and West Virginia
People from Augusta County, Virginia
People of Virginia in the French and Indian War
Virginia colonial people
Year of birth uncertain
Colonial American justices of the peace